Samuel T. Joeckel is an American author and professor of English. He taught at the Palm Beach Atlantic University for over 20 years. Joeckel is the author of two books and co-editor of a volume about Christian colleges.

Life 
Joeckel earned a B.A. from the University of Nevada, Las Vegas. He completed a M.A. at Baylor University. He earned a Ph.D. from Claremont Graduate University. His 2002 dissertation was titled, "The fiction of happiness": eighteenth-century experience, epistemology, and aesthetics.

Joeckel was a professor of English at the Palm Beach Atlantic University School of Liberal Arts and Sciences for over 20 years. On February 15, 2023, his contract was put on hold after the university received complaints regarding his teachings on race and racism. On March 15, the university terminated Joeckel's contract steming from a complaint received from a parent of a student about a his unit on racial justice.

Selected works

References 

Living people
Year of birth missing (living people)
Place of birth missing (living people)
University of Nevada, Las Vegas alumni
Baylor University alumni
Claremont Graduate University alumni
Palm Beach Atlantic University faculty
American academics of English literature
21st-century American male writers
Writers from Florida
21st-century American academics